Combat Support Group is part of the Royal Australian Air Force. Combat support Group (CSG) was formed in 1998 to provide the Air Force with a Force Element Group (FEG) capable of providing and coordinating the military airbase capabilities needed for the generation, operation and sustainment of Australian airpower.

Formerly named Operational Support Group, CSG's name today reflects its focus on military combat capabilities.

Today the Group provides the Air Force with a centralised control but decentralised execution model for the provision of military airbase capability. Wings and Squadrons strategically located throughout Australia and the Region enhances flexibility and optimises basing and support options for the ADF to conduct effective air operations during peace and conflict.

CSG has a proud history of making major contributions to recent ADF operations around the world, including deployments to the Solomon Islands, East Timor, Afghanistan, as well as support to the ADF contribution to the rehabilitation and reconstruction of Iraq. CSG has also played a significant role in providing FCS capabilities to Australian humanitarian missions including:

 Medical and evacuation assistance after the Bali Bombings in 2002 and 2005
 Tsunami relief operations in Sumatra in 2004
 Evacuation operations from Lebanon in 2006
 Rebuilding of Innisfail following Cyclone Larry in 2006

Subordinate Units 
As of 2017, Combat Support Group's main subordinate units were:
 No. 95 Wing RAAF
 No. 96 Wing RAAF
 Health Services Wing RAAF
 Combat Support Division

Further reading 
 Always There – A History of Air Force Combat Support, O’Brien, Graham, Air Power Development Centre, 1st Edition, 2009,

References 

RAAF groups